Buxières-les-Mines is a commune in the Allier department in central France.

Population

Transport
Buxières-les-Mines was served by railway. The railway station was Gare de Chavenon in the nearby city of Chavenon. It was used for the transport of coal.

Personalities
Louis Ganne, composer and conductor, was born in Buxières-les-Mines.

See also
Communes of the Allier department

References

Communes of Allier
Mining communities in France
Allier communes articles needing translation from French Wikipedia